John Christopher Bradshaw (23 June 1876–16 January 1950) was a New Zealand organist, conductor, choirmaster and university professor.

Biography 
Bradshaw was born in Adlington, Lancashire, England on 23 June 1876. He was a pupil of James Kendrick Pyne at the Royal Manchester College of Music. In 1902 Bradshaw was appointed organist at the Anglican cathedral in Christchurch. There, he founded the Christchurch Male Voice Choir. Bradshaw was lecturer at Canterbury College and dean of the Faculty of Music.

References

1876 births
1950 deaths
New Zealand academics
New Zealand conductors (music)
Male conductors (music)
English emigrants to New Zealand
New Zealand classical organists
Male classical organists
People from Adlington, Lancashire